Odostomia striolata is a species of sea snail, a marine gastropod mollusk in the family Pyramidellidae, the pyrams and their allies.

Distribution
This species occurs in the following locations:
 Atlantic Europe
 Azores Exclusive Economic Zone
 European waters (ERMS scope)
 Greek Exclusive Economic Zone
 Macaronesian Islands
 Mediterranean Sea
 Portuguese Exclusive Economic Zone
 Spanish Exclusive Economic Zone
 United Kingdom Exclusive Economic Zone

Notes
Additional information regarding this species:
 Habitat: Known from seamounts and knolls

References

External links
 To Biodiversity Heritage Library (10 publications)
 To CLEMAM
 To Encyclopedia of Life
 To World Register of Marine Species

striolata
Molluscs of the Atlantic Ocean
Molluscs of the Mediterranean Sea
Molluscs of Macaronesia
Gastropods described in 1850